Hameeduddin Aquil Husami was an Indian Islamic scholar. He was born on 23 July 1928 and died on 12 March 2010 at Hyderabad. He was a member of the Muslim Personal Law Board.

References

20th-century Muslim scholars of Islam
Scholars from Hyderabad, India
1928 births
2010 deaths